The Cabinet of Liechtenstein is the chief executive body of the Principality of Liechtenstein. The current cabinet was sworn in on 25 March 2021. According to the Constitution of Liechtenstein, the cabinet shall consist of the Prime Minister and four other Ministers. The Prime Minister and the other Ministers shall be appointed by the Reigning Prince with the agreement of Parliament and on its proposal. On the proposal of Parliament, one of the Ministers shall be appointed by the Reigning Prince as the Deputy Prime Minister. If an individual Minister should lose the confidence of the Reigning Prince or of Parliament, the decision on the loss of the authority of the Minister to exercise his functions shall be taken by mutual agreement of the Reigning Prince and Parliament. Until a new Minister has been appointed, the official duties of the Minister shall be performed by the Minister's alternate.

Current Ministers

|}

See also
 Politics of Liechtenstein

External links

  Government of Liechtenstein

Government of Liechtenstein
Liechtenstein
Liechtenstein